Fjelldal Chapel is a chapel of the Church of Norway in Tjeldsund Municipality in Troms og Finnmark county, Norway. It is located in the village of Fjelldal. It is an annex chapel in the Tjeldsund parish which is part of the Trondenes prosti (deanery) in the Diocese of Nord-Hålogaland. The white, wooden chapel was built in a long church style in 1960 using plans drawn up by the architect Birger Stoltenberg. The chapel seats about 140 people.

See also
List of churches in Nord-Hålogaland

References

Tjeldsund
Churches in Troms
Wooden churches in Norway
20th-century Church of Norway church buildings
Churches completed in 1960
1960 establishments in Norway
Long churches in Norway